Tweedale Rigg (1 November 1896 – 1973) was an English footballer who played as a wing half for Blackburn Rovers and Rochdale. He also played for Liverpool during World War One.

References

Blackburn Rovers F.C. players
Rochdale A.F.C. players
Chester City F.C. players
Manchester North End F.C. players
Great Harwood F.C. players
Liverpool F.C. wartime guest players
Footballers from Rochdale
English footballers
1896 births
1973 deaths
Association footballers not categorized by position